The Institute for Apprenticeships and Technical Education (IfATE) is an employer led organisation that supports technical education and apprenticeships in the United Kingdom, through qualifications such as T Levels. It is funded by the Department for Education of the Government of the United Kingdom.

Purpose
IfATE regulates and licenses bodies, such as further education colleges, to provide qualifications for apprenticeships in England. It was formed in April 2017 following on from the Apprenticeships, Skills, Children and Learning Act 2009 and work of the National Apprenticeship Service. IfATE is funded by the Education and Skills Funding Agency (ESFA), and is a non-departmental public body of the Department for Education (DfE).

Governance
 the IfATE board of directors includes:

 Fiona Kendrick 
 Jessica Leigh Jones 
 Ruby McGregor-Smith 
 Robin Millar 
 Toby Peyton-Jones 
 Malcolm Press 
 Bev Robinson 

Previous board members include Gerald Berragan and Antony Jenkins.

References

2017 establishments in England
Apprenticeship
Department for Education
Education regulators
Educational organisations based in England
Government agencies established in 2017
Non-departmental public bodies of the United Kingdom government
Organisations based in the City of Westminster
Vocational education in the United Kingdom